Marisa Bosman (born 3 May 1980), popularly known as Marisa Drummond, is a South African actress and director. She is best known for her roles in the popular serials Elke Skewe Pot, Stom and Isidingo.

Personal life
She was born on 3 May 1980 in Bloemfontein, South Africa. She graduated with a BA Drama and Theatre Arts degree from the University of the Free State. Then she moved to Johannesburg to pursue her acting career.

She is married to Christopher Drummond. After the birth of her child Annabel, she suffered with postnatal depression (PND). In her final trimester, she developed pre-eclampsia. Then she went into labour three weeks early and had to have an emergency Caesarean section.

Career
Her first major starring role in television screen came through the kykNET sitcom Hester & Ester Bester. In the serial, she played the role 'Ester', a dance instructor at Marthur Curry dance school. The series became highly popular and finally ran for 52 episodes in 2010. Then she appeared in several television series such as kykNET soapie Villa Rosa and the SABC2 drama series Geraamtes. She was made guest appearance in an episode of the SABC2 travel series Mooiloop! inn 2013. Then she appeared on television shows as Begeertes, Dof en Dilly Poppie and Sterlopers.

Apart from television, she has performed in several theatre productions such as The Sound of Music, My Fair Lady, Fiddler on the Roof and Ons vir Jou. She also appeared in the Broadway Theater production Thoroughly Modern Millie. In 2016, she made her directorial debut with the short Spoor(loos). In the same year, she starred in the thriller television series Fluiters. Then she appeared in the popular soapie Isidingo where she played the role 'Kimberly Lewis-Haines'. She also played the role 'Alexa' in the kykNET soap opera Binnelanders, in 2013. For the role she later won the inaugural Royalty Soapie Award for Outstanding Female Villain, in 2014.

In 2018, she became the director of the serial Getroud met rugby.

Filmography

As an actress

As an director

References

External links
 

Living people
South African television actresses
South African film actresses
People from Bloemfontein
1980 births
South African television directors
Women television directors